Banu Sa'd ibn Zayd Manat is a pre-Islamic Arab tribe. It is considered one of the main three branches of Tamim, the other two are Banu Hanzalah and 'Amr ibn Tamim.

Ancestry 
The tribe members trace their lineage to Sa'd ibn Zayd Manat ibn Tamim ibn Murr ibn 'Id ibn Amr ibn Ilyas ibn Mudar ibn Nizar ibn Ma'ad ibn Adnan. 

Sa'd ibn Zayd Manat had seven sons: Ka'b, 'Amr, al-Harith, 'Awafa, Jashm, Malik and 'Abshams. 

There are also sub-clans to the Banu Sa'd ibn Zayd Manat:

 Banu al-Haram
 Banu Hamman
 Banu al-A'raj
 Banu Qurai'
 Banu Bahdala
 Banu Barniq
 Banu 'Utarid

History 
A popular Arabic proverb seems to revolve around the progenitor of this tribe, Sa'd ibn Zayd Manat: 

أوردها سعدٌ وسعدٌ مشتمل ما هكذا تورد يا سعد الإبل

"Sa'd watered them, but was still wearing his cloak. Camels are not to be watered thus, O Sa'd."  

it is Malik, Sa'd's brother who said it. Because Sa'd did not take good care of the camels left to him to attend by his brother who was busy with his marriage.

See also 

 Tribes of Arabia
 Pre-Islamic Arabia
 Manat (goddess)

References 

Tribes of Arabia